Lichères is a commune in the Charente department in southwestern France. It straddles the river Charente comprising the villages of Lichéres, La Salle and Puychenin. The village of Lichéres is home to a 12th-century catholic church dedicated to Saint Denis. Although there is a conventional road bridge across the river Charente near La Salle there is also a very small ferry called a Barque. The Barque is guided by a steel wire with which users propel the boat.

Population

Gallery

See also
Communes of the Charente department

References

Communes of Charente